Azoarcus toluvorans is a bacterium from the genus of Azoarcus.

References

External links
Type strain of Azoarcus toluvorans at BacDive -  the Bacterial Diversity Metadatabase

Rhodocyclaceae
Bacteria described in 1999